The Hercules monument is a landmark in the German city of Kassel. It is located in the Bergpark Wilhelmshöhe (Wilhelmshöhe Mountainpark) in northern Hesse, Germany.

Hercules is a copper statue depicting the ancient Greek demigod Heracles (Gr. Ηρακλής, German Herkules). The statue is located at the top of a pyramid, which stands on top of the octagon; the statue and the other parts of the monument were constructed at different times. Today "Hercules" refers to the whole monument, including the Octagon and Pyramid. The monument is the highest point in the Wilhelmshöhe Bergpark.

The monument is located in Bad Wilhelmshöhe, on the Eastern ridge of the Habichtswald. It was built in an artificial dell of the Karlsberg ( above sea level) on the western-most and highest location of the line of sight Schloss Wilhelmshöhe – Hercules.

The Hercules monument and the surrounding Wilhelmshöhe Bergpark were inscribed as a World Heritage Site in 2013, owing to their outstanding Baroque architecture and intricate water features.

Design

Water features 

The water  starts from the Hercules monument and runs down the cascades, Steinhöfer's waterfall, the devil's bridge, finally tumbling down the aqueduct before finally arriving at the lake where a fountain of about  ends the spectacle. About  of water are needed.

This system relies on natural pressure from reservoirs and underground pipes whose locks are opened manually

During the summer (from May until October every Wednesday and Sunday afternoon), visitors can attend this event. Additionally, every first Saturday of the months of June, July, August and September this event takes place during the evening with lights of different colors illuminating the water, the fountain and the monument features.

Octagon and statue 

History 
Construction of the Bergpark began in 1696. The Hercules statue was built from 1701 to 1717 and is based on the design of the Italian Giovanni Francesco Guerniero.  The complex is the northernmost part of the park and is an important baroque aspect of the Bergpark Wilhelmshöhe. 520 steps lead to the top.

In late 2005, a restructuring of the entire monument, including the statue was initiated. Initially projected was to be completed in 2009. The restoration was later estimated to cost more than 24 million Euro and last through 2018.

Material 

The complete structure (Octagon and Cascades) are made of Tuff sourced from quarries nearby. This soft material has the advantage of good workability, but weathers quickly, particularly by frost-related erosion. This rapid weathering process has been a structural issue for the statue.

Further reading
 Giovanni Francesco Guerniero, Delineatio Montis, Cassel 1706 Faksimile, Leipzig 1988 (auch Stuttgart 1988)
 Paul Heidelbach, Die Geschichte der Wilhelmshöhe. Klinkhardt & Biermann, Leipzig, 1909 Faksimile, Ed: Dieter Carl, Vellmar 2005
 Christiane Lukatis (ed.), Herkules. Tugendheld und Herrscherideal. Das Herkules- Monument in Kassel- Wilhelmshöhe., Eurasburg 1997, 
 Thomas Ludwig, Der Herkules in Kassel, 2004,

References

External links
 Google Sketchup Model of the castle
 Video of the waterfeatures  (Not available to view outside of Germany)

Baroque architecture in Germany
Buildings and structures in Kassel
Copper sculptures in Germany
Sculptures of Heracles
Museumslandschaft Hessen Kassel
Palaces in Hesse
Sculptures of men in Germany
Sculptures of mythology
Statues in Germany
Tourist attractions in Hesse
World Heritage Sites in Germany